District 1 may refer to:

 I District, Turku, in Finland
 District 1, Düsseldorf, a district in Düsseldorf, Germany
 Sector 1 (Bucharest), also known as District 1, in Bucharest, Romania
 District I, Budapest in Budapest, Hungary 
 District 1, Grand Bassa County, in Liberia
 District 1, an electoral district of Malta
 District 1, a police district of Malta
 Altstadt (Zürich), also known as District 1, in Zürich, Switzerland
 District 1 (New York City Council), in New York City, United States
 Michigan's 1st Senate district, United States
 Michigan's 1st House of Representatives district, United States
 Michigan's 1st congressional district, United States
 District 1, Ho Chi Minh City, in Vietnam

Fictional districts
 District 1 (The Hunger Games), a fictional district in The Hunger Games book and film series

See also
 1st District